The Red Republican was a British socialist newspaper published from 22 June 1850 to 30 November 1850, after which it was renamed The Friend of the People.

Foundation
The paper was founded in 1850 by George Julian Harney, after he was forced to resign from editing the Northern Star by its owner, Feargus O'Connor, who disagreed with his socialism.

Newspaper
Harney tried to use the paper to educate the working classes about socialism and proletarian internationalism, and advocated socialism within the trade union movement. The Red Republican published the first English translation of the Communist Manifesto in 1850, but was not a financial success and closed down in December of the same year.

Subsequently, Harney published the Friend of the People (December 1850 – April 1852), Star of Freedom (April 1852 – December 1852) and The Vanguard (January 1853 – March 1853).

External links
 The Red republican & the friend of the people.   Full reprint with introduction London : Merlin Press 1966
 Page at Spartacus Educational

Socialist newspapers published in the United Kingdom
Publications established in 1850
1850 establishments in the United Kingdom
Publications disestablished in 1850
1850 disestablishments in the United Kingdom
Chartist newspapers